The Hong Kong Holocaust and Tolerance Centre (HKHTC) is a Hong Kong-based, not-for-profit organisation dedicated to advancing Holocaust education and promoting tolerance situated in the city of Hong Kong, Special Administrative Region, People’s Republic of China. 

HKHTC was founded in 2011 and is the first organisation devoted to Holocaust education in China. The Centre was founded by Hong Kong residents to raise awareness and promote education about the Holocaust both in Hong Kong and regionally.

HKHTC curates public exhibits, runs educational workshops and brings Holocaust survivors to the region in order to provide an educational opportunity which is uncommon in Asia. These activities have reached tens of thousands of students. The Centre also provides educational content and opportunities about other regional genocides, such as the Nanjing Massacre and Cambodian genocide.

References 

Holocaust-related organizations
2011 establishments in Hong Kong
Shau Kei Wan
Genocide education
Non-profit organisations based in Hong Kong
Organizations established in 2011
Jews and Judaism in Hong Kong
Jewish Chinese history
History of the Jews in Asia